Evippa is a genus of spiders in the family Lycosidae. It was first described in 1882 by Simon. , it contains 37 species widely distributed in Asia and Africa.

Species
Evippa comprises the following species:
Evippa aculeata (Kroneberg, 1875)
Evippa aequalis Alderweireldt, 1991
Evippa apsheronica Marusik, Guseinov & Koponen, 2003
Evippa arenaria (Audouin, 1826)
Evippa badchysica Sternbergs, 1979
Evippa banarensis Tikader & Malhotra, 1980
Evippa benevola (O. Pickard-Cambridge, 1885)
Evippa beschkentica Andreeva, 1976
Evippa caucasica Marusik, Guseinov & Koponen, 2003
Evippa concolor (Kroneberg, 1875)
Evippa douglasi Hogg, 1912
Evippa eltonica Dunin, 1994
Evippa fortis Roewer, 1955
Evippa jabalpurensis Gajbe, 2004
Evippa jocquei Alderweireldt, 1991
Evippa kazachstanica Ponomarev, 2007
Evippa kirchshoferae Roewer, 1959
Evippa lugubris Chen, Song & Kim, 1998
Evippa luteipalpis Roewer, 1955
Evippa mandlaensis Gajbe, 2004
Evippa massaica (Roewer, 1959)
Evippa nigerrima (Miller & Buchar, 1972)
Evippa onager Simon, 1895
Evippa praelongipes (O. Pickard-Cambridge, 1871)
Evippa projecta Alderweireldt, 1991
Evippa rajasthanea Tikader & Malhotra, 1980
Evippa rubiginosa Simon, 1885
Evippa russellsmithi Alderweireldt, 1991
Evippa schenkeli Sternbergs, 1979
Evippa shivajii Tikader & Malhotra, 1980
Evippa sibirica Marusik, 1995
Evippa sjostedti Schenkel, 1936
Evippa soderbomi Schenkel, 1936
Evippa sohani Tikader & Malhotra, 1980
Evippa solanensis Tikader & Malhotra, 1980
Evippa strandi (Lessert, 1926)
Evippa turkmenica Sternbergs, 1979

References

Lycosidae
Araneomorphae genera
Spiders of Africa
Spiders of Asia